Epipagis zinghalis is a moth in the family Crambidae. It is found in Venezuela, Costa Rica and Jamaica.

References

Moths described in 1859
Spilomelinae